Scot Armstrong is an American screenwriter, director, and producer. He is credited with writing or co-writing numerous comedy films, including Old School, The Hangover: Part II, Semi-Pro, Road Trip, and many others. He is also the writer and director of the 2015 film, Search Party. The film was released in the US in May 2016. Also in 2016, his TV series, Dice, premiered on Showtime.

Early life

Armstrong grew up in Wheaton, Illinois, in the western suburbs of Chicago. He attended Wheaton North High School where he wrestled. He attended college at Bradley University in Peoria, Illinois.

Career

Armstrong started out working at an advertising agency in Chicago in his early 20s. While working there, he took night classes at The Second City and ImprovOlympic where he studied under Del Close. He also performed (and continues to perform) with the Upright Citizens Brigade in groups/shows including Mother, Feature Feature, Asscatt, and Soundtrack. During this time, he met Todd Phillips whom he hired to direct a commercial for Miller Genuine Draft. In 2000, the two released their first feature film together, Road Trip, which Armstrong co-wrote and Phillips directed.
 
Armstrong and Phillips would end up working on a variety of other films together including Old School (2003), Starsky & Hutch (2004), School for Scoundrels (2006), and The Hangover: Part II (2011). Outside of his partnership with Phillips, Armstrong was also responsible for uncredited rewrites of Elf and Bad Santa. In 2007, he co-wrote the Farrelly Brothers' film, The Heartbreak Kid. The following year, Semi-Pro, which was Armstrong's first solo-written film, was released.
 
In 2011, Armstrong announced the concept for his directorial debut, Road to Nardo. The film was set to begin production in 2011. Its name was changed to Search Party and the distribution rights were picked up by Universal in 2013. The film was eventually released in 2015 and was released in May 2016 in the United States. Armstrong's production company, American Work Inc., has also produced several films and TV shows including Hesher, NBC's Best Friends Forever, a TV series adaptation of Problem Child, and the USA Network's Playing House (among others).
 
In 2015, Showtime gave Armstrong's show, Dice, a straight-to-series order of six episodes. The series—which Armstrong writes, directs, and produces—follows the exploits of a fictional version of Andrew Dice Clay and premiered on Showtime in 2016.
 
Armstrong also co-hosts the UCB Sports & Leisure Podcast, alongside Matt Walsh.

Filmography
Film

Executive producer
 Hesher (2010)

Uncredited rewrite
 Elf (2003)
 Bad Santa (2003)

Television

References

External links

 
 

American male screenwriters
American television writers
American film directors
American television directors
Living people
1970 births
Upright Citizens Brigade Theater performers
21st-century American comedians
American male television writers
21st-century American screenwriters
21st-century American male writers